Aydınlar is a village in the Elazığ District of Elazığ Province in Turkey. Its population is 64 (2021). The village is populated by Turks.

References

Villages in Elazığ District